Kamaljit Singh (born 28 December 1995) is an Indian professional footballer who plays as a goalkeeper for East Bengal in the Indian Super League.

Career
Singh started his career with the AIFF Academy before signing for Sporting Clube de Goa in 2014. He made his debut for the side on 29 October 2014 against United in the Durand Cup. He played the full 90 minutes in goal as Sporting Goa won the match 3–2. He then made his official professional debut for the Goan club on 6 November 2014 during the Durand Cup semi-finals against Pune. He once again played the full-match in goal as Sporting Goa fell 1–2.

International
Singh has represented the India U19 team during the Weifang Cup in 2011. Singh was also called-up to the India U23 team for their 2014 Asian Games training camp. He was eventually named in the final roster for the Asian Games. Singh was also named on the bench for two matches against the United Arab Emirates U23 and Jordan U23 but he did not see any time during the tournament.

Career statistics

Club

Honours 

India
 SAFF Championship runner-up: 2018
 King's Cup third place: 2019

India U23
 South Asian Games Silver medal: 2016

References

1995 births
Living people
Footballers from Delhi
Indian footballers
India international footballers
Sporting Clube de Goa players
Association football goalkeepers
India youth international footballers
Footballers at the 2014 Asian Games
Asian Games competitors for India
RoundGlass Punjab FC players
I-League players
Indian Super League players
FC Pune City players
Hyderabad FC players
Odisha FC players
South Asian Games silver medalists for India
South Asian Games medalists in football